Michael A. McDaniel is an American industrial and organizational psychologist and Emeritus Professor in the Department of Management at Virginia Commonwealth University, where he was concurrently a research professor in the Department of Psychology. He is known for his research on personnel selection and publication bias, as well as on the relationship between brain size and intelligence. His current research interests include personnel selection, publication bias, and research integrity. He is employed at Work Skills First, Inc., a human resource consulting firm specializing in personnel selection and expert witness services related to personnel selection. He was elected as a Fellow into the American Psychological Association, the Association for Psychological Science, and the Society for Industrial and Organizational Psychology. In 2015, he served a one-year term as president of the International Society for Intelligence Research (ISIR).

References

External links
McDaniel's CV and Research Publications

Virginia Commonwealth University faculty
Living people
21st-century American psychologists
Organizational psychologists
George Washington University alumni
Fellows of the American Psychological Association
Intelligence researchers
Fellows of the Association for Psychological Science
Year of birth missing (living people)